Katiran-e Pain (also Romanized as Katīrān-e Pā’īn; also known as Katīrān-e Soflá, Ketīrā, Khatīrān, and Khetirān) is a village in Nahr-e Mian Rural District, Zalian District, Shazand County, Markazi Province, Iran. At the 2006 census, its population was 186, in 52 families.

References 

Populated places in Shazand County